Arthur Island (Ostrov Artura) is an island in Franz Josef Land, Russia. It belongs administratively to the Arkhangelsk Oblast of the Russian Federation.

Geography
Arthur Island lies in the Queen Victoria Sea north of Zemlya Georga, relatively far from any other island.

Arthur Island is practically completely glacierized. Only a small area (Mys Ledovoy Razvedky) in the northwestern shores of the island and another (Mys Nizkiy) in the southernmost point of the island are free of glacier ice.

This island was named by Frederick George Jackson after his brother Arthur Jackson, in the Jackson-Harmsworth Polar Expedition.

See also 
 List of islands of Russia

References

External links 
 Jackson-Harmsworth Polar Expedition

Islands of Franz Josef Land